The Mare is a  river in the Hérault department in southern France, which rises in the Caroux-Espinouse hills.

The river's source is above Castanet-le-Haut in the Parc naturel régional du Haut-Languedoc. The river passes through Saint-Gervais-sur-Mare and Villemagne-l'Argentière, before joining the Orb at Hérépian.

Communes traversed
The river passes through the following communes, from source to mouth:
Castanet-le-Haut  
Rosis  
Saint-Gervais-sur-Mare  
Saint-Étienne-Estréchoux  
La Tour-sur-Orb  
Bédarieux   
Taussac-la-Billière  
Villemagne-l'Argentière 
Hérépian

References

Rivers of France
Rivers of Occitania (administrative region)
Rivers of Hérault
1Mare